Herbert Arthur Walton was an Anglican priest in  the twentieth century.

He was educated at King Edward's School, Birmingham and St Boniface Missionary College, Warminster; and ordained in 1905. After a curacy at St John's Cathedral, Antigua he was Rector of St George, Dominica then Archdeacon of Grenada from 1915 to 1922; then Organising Secretary for the SPG in The Midlands from  1922 to 1924; Rector  of Avon Dassett from 1924 to 1927; Home Secretary of the SPG from 1927 until 1933;  Rector  of  Ascot from 1933 to 1946 and  Rector  of Brightwell-cum-Sotwell from 1946 to 1954.

He died on 15 April 1955.

References

People from Birmingham, West Midlands
People educated at King Edward's School, Birmingham
Alumni of Selwyn College, Cambridge
Archdeacons of Grenada
1955 deaths
Year of birth missing
People from Brightwell-cum-Sotwell